Villefranque may refer to:

 Villefranque, Hautes-Pyrénées, France
 Villefranque, Pyrénées-Atlantiques, France

See also 
 Villafranca (disambiguation)